G-Force is a 2009 American spy adventure-comedy film produced by Walt Disney Pictures and Jerry Bruckheimer Films. Directed by Hoyt Yeatman and written by Cormac and Marianne Wibberley with a story by Yeatman, the film is his directorial debut, having earlier worked in the area of visual effects alongside co-founding Dream Quest Images. The film stars Zach Galifianakis, Bill Nighy, and Will Arnett and it features the voices of Sam Rockwell, Tracy Morgan, Penélope Cruz, Jon Favreau, Nicolas Cage, and Steve Buscemi. Sony Pictures Imageworks handled the film's visual effects. The story follows Darwin (Rockwell) and his team of specially trained rodents (Tracy Morgan, Penélope Cruz and Jon Favreau) who, after failing a mission, must break out of a pet shop and stop an evil billionare from taking over the world.

G-Force was released in the United States on July 24, 2009. It grossed $292.8 million worldwide against a production budget of $150 million budget. It received negative reviews from critics.

Plot

A special government program, training and deploying highly intelligent rodents as espionage agents, is facing abolition from the FBI. To save the department, Dr. Ben Kendall, the head of the program, orders an unauthorized misson for the primary field team known as G-Force, consisting three guinea pigs named Darwin, Blaster, Juarez, respectively, a mole named Speckles, and a fly named Mooch. The mission is to infiltrate the residence of home electronics magnate, Leonard Saber, and acquiring information about a new microchip he has developed. Darwin finds a classified file titled Clusterstorm on Saber's personal computer, containing plans for global extermination, and downloads it to his PDA. However, the file turns out to be false, showing only design plans for a coffee machine, which angers Ben's superior, Agent Kip Killian, and shuts down the program. He orders the animals' capture, forcing Darwin, Blaster, Juarez, and Speckles to escape and hide in a delivery truck. 

The truck goes to a pet store where they are mistaken for ordinary rodents and are locked up in a cage. There, they meet Hurley, another guinea pig, Bucky, a hamster, and three mice. Determined to finish their mission, each of them forms an escaping plan. Blaster and Juarez get themselves sold to a family, while Speckles pretends to be dead to get burried, but is thrown into a garbage truck instead, seemingly crushed to death. Darwin escapes with Hurley's help, who becomes convinced that Darwin is his long-lost brother due to their birthmark. While Blaster and Juarez escape their new owners, Ben and his assistant, Marcie retrive Darwin's PDA from the FBI, and disvover that it is infected with an exterminaton virus. Saber holds a meeting with his associates, including his prime engineer, the unseen Mr. Yanshu, and reports that Clusterstorm will launch in less than 48 hours.

On their way to Ben's house, Darwin and Hurley see a Saberling coffee machine and Darwin decides to investigate it. Upon trying to remove its microchip, the coffee machine turns into a violent robot but they manage to destroy it. G-Force reunites at Ben's, but after hearing of what happened to Speckles, Ben tells the team that neither of them were genetically engineered as they believed to. They were rescued from various places, and Darwin himself was bought from a pet shop just like Hurley told him earlier. Despite learning their true origins, the team still has their faith in themselves. Deciding to use the infected PDA to shut down the microchips, they go  to Saber's mansion in their hamster ball-shaped vehicles, during which they escape from the FBI agents sent by Killian to capture them. 

At Saber's mansion, the team tries to reach the mainframe, but Hurley accidentally activates a bomb trap, resulting in an explosion that seperates Blaster and Juarez from Darwin. Clusterstorm activates, turning all Saberling products into killing machines around the world. When an FBI field team led by Killian arrives at Saber's, he claims he simply wanted to use the microchips for electronic communication. Darwin finds Speckles alive in Saber's basement, who reveals himself to be Mr. Yanshu, the mastermind behind Clusterstorm (Yanshu means "mole" in Chinese). He explains his plan to use the Saberling products for a bombardment of space debris to make Earth's surface uninhabitable, therefore destroying humanity as a revenge for killing his family. He amalgamates the various appliances into a giant walking robot, which attacks the police. Darwin falls from above, losing the PDA in the process, but Hurley saves him and uses his weight to lift Darwin up to the robot.

Darwin tries to convince Speckles to change his ways, reminding him of how Ben took them in and made them a real family. Realizing G-Force is his family now, Speckles tries but fails to shut down the system. Mooch recovers the PDA and Darwin uploads the virus to the main server, destroying the robot, while Blaster and Juarez save them form falling. They later find Hurley under the ruins, injured and unconscious. Darwin states that Hurley's actions were truly heroic, and finally acknowledges him as his brother. Hurley regains consciousness and becomes a member of the team. 

G-Force receives personal recognition from the FBI Director, who tells them that Saber recalled all his products, while Speckles is given the duty of removing the microchips before rejoining the team. Killian is relocated to an FBI base on the South Pole as a punishment for trying to arrest G-Force. The FBI gives full support to Ben's program, with Bucky and the mice joining it, and Darwin, Blaster, Juarez, and Hurley become official FBI Special Agents.

Cast

Voice cast

 Sam Rockwell as Darwin (FBI Special Agent), a snarky and no-nonsense crested guinea pig, the head of G-Force.
 Tracy Morgan as Blaster (FBI Special Agent), a bombastic and excitable fox guinea pig, the weapons expert of G-Force. He is also Juarez's love interest.
 Penélope Cruz as Juarez (FBI Special Agent), a Spanish-accented and tomboyish female agouti guinea pig, the muscle of G-Force. She is also Blaster's love interest.
 Jon Favreau as Hurley (FBI Rookie), a laid-back and absent-minded Abyssinian guinea pig and Darwin's long lost brother.
 Nicolas Cage as Speckles, the cyber intelligent star-nosed mole, the brains of G-Force with a secret agenda of his own.
 Steve Buscemi as Bucky, a territorial and aggressive golden hamster, mistakenly called a ferret, who is friends with a trio of sycophantic mice.
 Dee Bradley Baker as Mooch, a green bottle fly and reconnaissance specialist of G-Force.
 Hoyt Yeatman IV and Max Favreau as the trio of sycophantic mice
 Roxana Ortega as Additional Voices

Live action cast
 Zach Galifianakis as Dr. Ben Kendall, a scientist and the trainer of G-Force
 Bill Nighy as Leonard Saber, a former weapons dealer and the head of Saberling Industries
 Will Arnett as Agent Kip Killian, the leader of the FBI task force who has to track down G-Force dead or alive
 Kelli Garner as Marcie, Ben's assistant who helps G-Force team escape from the FBI by transporting them in tubes
 Tyler Patrick Jones as Connor
 Piper Mackenzie Harris as Penny Goodman
 Jack Conley as Special Agent David Trygstad, one of Kip Killian's FBI special agents
 Niecy Nash as Rosalita
 Justin Mentell as Terrell
 Gabriel Casseus as Special Agent Carter, one of Kip Killian's FBI special agents
 Loudon Wainwright III as Grandpa
 Chris Ellis as the FBI Director who Kendall and G-Force answer to

Production

Development

On 14 October 2008, Hoyt Yeatman was set to direct G-Force. Cormac and Marianne Wibberley wrote the script for the film. Jerry Bruckheimer produced the film with the budget of $150 million for release in 2009. On 17 October, it was announced that Sam Rockwell, Tracy Morgan, Penélope Cruz, Nicolas Cage, Jon Favreau, Steve Buscemi, Zach Galifianakis, Bill Nighy, Kelli Garner, Will Arnett, Gabriel Casseus and Jack Conley joined the film. Dee Bradley Baker joined the cast on 12 November to play Mooch, a housefly. On 18 November, it was announced that Trevor Rabin would compose the music for the film. On 23 November, Walt Disney Studios Motion Pictures acquired distribution rights to the film. Development of the film was completed in Los Angeles, California. Production then moved to Santa Clarita, California for the final phases of animation and production in order to maximize tax credits offered to foreign film projects in America.

Music

Trevor Rabin scored the music for the film and its soundtrack. The soundtrack also contains "I Gotta Feeling" and "Boom Boom Pow" performed by The Black Eyed Peas, "Just Dance" performed by Lady Gaga and Colby O'Donis, "Jump" performed by Flo Rida and Nelly Furtado, "Don't Cha" performed by The Pussycat Dolls and Busta Rhymes, "Mexicano" performed by Tremander, "Ready to Rock" performed by Steve Rushton, "How Do You Sleep?" performed by Jesse McCartney and Ludacris, "Falling Down" performed by Space Cowboy and "O Fortuna" performed by London Symphony Orchestra & Richard Hickox.

Filming
G-Force was filmed at 992 S Oakland Avenue, Pasadena, California, USA, Culver Studios – 9336 W. Washington Blvd., Culver City, California, USA, Los Angeles, California, USA and Santa Clarita, California, USA in 2009.

Release

Theatrical release
G-Force was theatrically released on July 24, 2009 by Walt Disney Pictures and Jerry Bruckheimer Films.

Home media
G-Force was released on DVD and Blu-ray on December 15, 2009 by Walt Disney Studios Home Entertainment.

Reception

Box office
G-Force grossed $119,436,770 in North America and $173,381,071 internationally for a worldwide total of $292,810,686, against a budget of $150 million.

North America
In its opening weekend, the film earned $31.7 million, ranking at No. 1, and replacing Harry Potter and the Half-Blood Prince. The film declined −44.8% on its second week behind Funny People and Harry Potter and the Half-Blood Prince.

Critical response
On review aggregator Rotten Tomatoes, the film holds an approval rating of 22% based on 126 reviews, with an average rating of 4.43/10. The website's critics consensus reads: "G-Force features manic action, but fails to come up with interesting characters or an inspired plot." On Metacritic, the film has a weighted average score of 41 out of 100, based on 19 critics, indicating "mixed or average reviews". Roger Ebert of the Chicago Sun-Times gave the film 2.5 stars out of four and called it "a pleasant, inoffensive 3-D animated farce". Audiences polled by CinemaScore gave the film an average grade of "B+" on an A+ to F scale.

Awards
ASCAP Film and Television Music Awards 2010 

Visual Effects Society Awards 2010

Video game

The video game based on the film was released for PlayStation 3, PlayStation 2, Xbox 360, Wii, PlayStation Portable, Nintendo DS and Microsoft Windows on July 21, 2009. The PS3 and Xbox 360 versions come with 3-D glasses.

Soundtrack

G-Force: Original Motion Picture Soundtrack is the film's soundtrack album by Various artists and was released on May 1, 2009 by Walt Disney Records.

Soundtrack list
 I Gotta Feeling – Performed by The Black Eyed Peas
 Boom Boom Pow – Performed by The Black Eyed Peas
 Just Dance – Performed by Lady Gaga and Colby O'Donis
 Jump – Performed by Flo Rida and Nelly Furtado
 Don't Cha – Performed by The Pussycat Dolls and Busta Rhymes 
 Mexicano – Performed by Tremander
 Ready to Rock – Performed by Steve Rushton
 How Do You Sleep? – Performed by Jesse McCartney and Ludacris
 Falling Down – Performed by Space Cowboy
 O Fortuna – Performed by London Symphony Orchestra & Richard Hickox

References

External links

 
 
 
 

2009 films
2009 3D films
2000s buddy comedy films
2000s science fiction comedy films
American films with live action and animation
American 3D films
American buddy comedy films
American children's comedy films
American science fiction comedy films
Fictional cavies
Films scored by Trevor Rabin
Films about animal rights
American films about revenge
Films produced by Jerry Bruckheimer
Films set in Los Angeles
Films shot in Los Angeles
Walt Disney Pictures films
2009 directorial debut films
2009 comedy films
Animated films about mammals
Films about the Federal Bureau of Investigation
2000s English-language films
2000s American films